Joseph Kessel (10 February 1898 – 23 July 1979), also known as "Jef", was a French journalist and novelist. He was a member of the Académie française and Grand Officer of the Legion of Honour.

Biography
Kessel was born to a Jewish family in Villa Clara, Entre Ríos, Argentina, because of the constant journeys of his father, a Litvak physician. From 1905 to 1908, Joseph Kessel lived the first years of his childhood in Orenburg, Russia, before the family moved to France in 1908. He studied in lycée Masséna, Nice and lycée Louis-le-Grand, Paris and took part in the First World War as an aviator. He was also an aviator during the Second World War, in the Free French  (342 Squadron RAF) with RAF Bomber Command, with Romain Gary, who was also a talented French novelist.

Kessel wrote several novels and books that were later represented in the cinema, notably Belle de Jour (by Luis Buñuel in 1967). In 1943 he and his nephew Maurice Druon translated Anna Marly's song Chant des Partisans into French from its original Russian. The song became one of the anthems of Free French Forces during the Second World War.

Kessel was elected to the Académie française in 1962 and died on 23 July 1979 in Avernes, Val-d'Oise of a ruptured aneurysm. He is buried in Paris in the Cimetière du Montparnasse. On his deathbed, he was quoted as saying that his greatest accomplishment was the birth of his son, Joseph Kessel, who was born just a few months prior on 24 February of the same year. The Joseph-Kessel Prize (Prix Joseph Kessel) is a prestigious prize in French language literature, given to "a book of a high literary value written in French". The jury counts or has counted among its members Tahar Ben Jelloun, Jean-Marie Drot, Michèle Kahn, Pierre Haski, Gilles Lapouge, Michel Le Bris, Érik Orsenna, Patrick Rambaud, Jean-Christophe Rufin, André Velter and Olivier Weber.

Bibliography 
 La steppe rouge (1922)
 L'Équipage (1923)
 Au camp des vaincus ou la critique du 11 mai  (1924)
 Mary de Cork (1925)
 Les captifs (1926; Grand Prix du roman de l'Académie française)
 Nuits de princes (1927)
 Belle de Jour (1928; it inspired Luis Buñuel's 1967 movie of the same name)
 Vent de sable (1929)
 Fortune carrée (1932)
  (1931; made into the movie Sirocco in 1951 with Humphrey Bogart)
Wagon-lit (1932)
 La Passante du Sans-Souci (1936; turned into a movie by Jacques Rouffio in 1982)
 Hollywood, Ville mirage (Gallimard, NRF, 1936)
 Mermoz (1938)
 L'Armée des ombres (1943; adapted for a movie by Jean-Pierre Melville in 1969); Army of Shadows (Contra Mundum Press: 2017), featuring an intro by Stuart Kendall
 Le Bataillon du ciel (Sky Battalion), (1946; turned into a movie by Alexander Esway in 1947): Free French SAS paratroopers in Brittany in Summer 1944
 Le tour du malheur (1950)
 Les Amants du Tage (1954)
 La Vallée des Rubis (1955)
 Le lion (English translation: The Lion; 1958)
 Les mains du miracle (Gallimard, 1960).
 Les cavaliers (1967) (English translation: The Horsemen. Translated by Patrick O'Brian. New York: Farrar, Straus & Giroux, 1968) (filmed as The Horsemen in 1971.)
 Partout un ami (1972)
 Des hommes (1972)
 Les temps sauvages (1975)
 The escape

Filmography 
 The Crew, directed by Maurice Tourneur (France, 1928, based on the novel L'Équipage)
 , directed by Marcel L'Herbier (France, 1930, based on the novel Nuits de princes)
 L'Équipage, directed by Anatole Litvak (France, 1935, based on the novel L'Équipage)
 The Woman I Love, directed by Anatole Litvak (1937, based on the novel L'Équipage)
 , directed by Vladimir Strizhevsky (France, 1938, based on the novel Nuits de princes)
 Le Bataillon du ciel, directed by Alexander Esway (France, 1947, based on the novel Le Bataillon du ciel)
 Sirocco, directed by Curtis Bernhardt (1951, based on the novel Le coup de grâce)
 The Lovers of Lisbon, directed by Henri Verneuil (France, 1955, based on the novel Les Amants du Tage)
 , directed by Bernard Borderie (France, 1955, based on the novel Fortune carrée)
 The Lion, directed by Jack Cardiff (1962, based on the novel The Lion)
 Belle de Jour, directed by Luis Buñuel (France, 1967, based on the novel Belle de Jour)
 Army of Shadows, directed by Jean-Pierre Melville (France, 1969, based on the novel L'Armée des ombres)
 The Horsemen, directed by John Frankenheimer (1971, based on the novel Les Cavaliers)
 The Passerby, directed by Jacques Rouffio (France, 1982, based on the novel La Passante du Sans-Souci)

Screenwriter 
 Cessez le feu (dir. Jacques de Baroncelli, France, 1934)
 Mayerling (dir. Anatole Litvak, France, 1936)
 Les Bateliers de la Volga (dir. Vladimir Strizhevsky, France, 1936)
 La Peur (dir. Victor Tourjansky, France, 1936)
 The Secrets of the Red Sea (dir. Richard Pottier, France, 1937)
 The Man from Niger (dir. Jacques de Baroncelli, France, 1940)
 At the Grand Balcony (dir. Henri Decoin, France, 1949)
 Le Grand Cirque (dir. Georges Péclet, France, 1950)
 Act of Love (dir. Anatole Litvak, 1953)
 Oasis (dir. Yves Allégret, France, 1955)
  (dir. Pierre Schoendoerffer and Jacques Dupont, France, 1958)
 The Night of the Generals (dir. Anatole Litvak, 1967)

References

External links
 
 Biography at the Académie française 
 Plaisir Litteraire:  an interesting contribution about the youth of Joseph Kessel's father  
 http://www.rts.ch/archives/tv/culture/preface/3467832-joseph-kessel.html

1898 births
1979 deaths
People from Entre Ríos Province
Argentine Jews
Argentine people of Lithuanian-Jewish descent
French people of Lithuanian-Jewish descent
Democratic Union of Labour politicians
20th-century French novelists
French male novelists
French travel writers
French war correspondents
Jewish novelists
French military personnel of World War I
French military personnel of World War II
Members of the Académie Française
Lycée Louis-le-Grand alumni
Grand Officiers of the Légion d'honneur
Grand Prix du roman de l'Académie française winners
Burials at Montparnasse Cemetery
20th-century French male writers
French male non-fiction writers